Admiral Henry James Langford Clarke, CBE (1 January 1866 – 28 March 1944) was a Royal Navy admiral.

References 

1866 births
1944 deaths
Commanders of the Order of the British Empire
Royal Navy admirals
Royal Navy admirals of World War I